The Jiangellaceae are the only family of the order Jiangellales, which is a part of the phylum Actinomycetota.

Phylogeny
The currently accepted taxonomy is based on the List of Prokaryotic names with Standing in Nomenclature and the phylogeny is based on whole-genome sequences.

References

Actinomycetia
Bacteria families